Clifford "Cliff" Harrison (October 30, 1927 – December 15, 1988) was an American ice hockey player who competed in the Olympic games in 1952. He was a member of the national team that won the silver medal in Oslo.  He was born in Walpole, Massachusetts.  He attended Dartmouth College.

Awards and honors

References

External links
 

1927 births
1988 deaths
American men's ice hockey centers
Dartmouth Big Green men's ice hockey players
Ice hockey players from Massachusetts
Ice hockey players at the 1952 Winter Olympics
Medalists at the 1952 Winter Olympics
Olympic silver medalists for the United States in ice hockey
People from Walpole, Massachusetts
AHCA Division I men's ice hockey All-Americans
20th-century American people